Pål Steffen Andresen (born 19 May 1982) is a Norwegian football defender who plays for Strømmen.

Club career
Andresen spent his entire career with Lillestrøm SK before joining Ull/Kisa in 2012. He has been capped 4 times for the Norwegian under-21 team.

Career statistics

References

External links
Club bio

1982 births
Living people
People from Lillestrøm
Norwegian footballers
Eliteserien players
Lillestrøm SK players
Ullensaker/Kisa IL players
Strømmen IF players
Norwegian First Division players
Association football defenders
Sportspeople from Viken (county)